Villanueva del Pardillo is a municipality of the Community of Madrid, Spain.

Villanueva del Pardillo website: news, culture, stores and companies...

Municipalities in the Community of Madrid